Something Better Change is the debut album by Canadian punk rock band D.O.A. The album was recorded between 1977 and 1980 in Vancouver, British Columbia, Canada and was released in 1980 on the label Can. Friends. (See 1980 in music).

For nearly two decades since Something Better Change and the follow-up album Hardcore '81 went out of print, the albums were compiled into the compilation Bloodied But Unbowed, and then, to address the numerous songs removed in the process, the Polish import greatest hits album Greatest Shits was released. Music critic Jack Rabid stated that "when one considers how revolutionary and yet how distinct from each other those two LPs were, this state of affairs just made no sense.".

In 2000, the album was re-issued on lead singer Joey Shithead's own label Sudden Death records for a native Canada release. In 2002 it was re-released on Dead Kennedys former front-man Jello Biafra's Alternative Tentacles music label. The re-issue included a single bonus track, a re-recording off their first EP originally titled "Disco Sucks", but now titled "New Wave Sucks". In May 2011, a remastered version of the album was released by Sudden Death Records on CD and vinyl LP. In 2013, the album was listed at number 10 in Ballast's list of top 50 Canadian albums of all time.

Track listing

Personnel

The band
 Chuck Biscuits – Drums
 David Gregg – Guitar, Keyboards
 Randy Rampage – Bass
 Joey Shithead - Guitar, Vocals

Additional musicians
 Simon Wilde – Bass (on tracks 5, 9, 10, and 13)

Technical staff
 Richard Drake – producer, engineer
 Ron Obvious – engineer (on track 12)

References

1980 debut albums
D.O.A. (band) albums
Sudden Death Records albums
Alternative Tentacles albums